Hitomi Tada (born 13 October 1991) is a Japanese handball player for MIE violet' IRIS and the Japanese national team.

She participated at the 2017 World Women's Handball Championship.

References

1991 births
Living people
Japanese female handball players
Handball players at the 2018 Asian Games
Asian Games bronze medalists for Japan
Asian Games medalists in handball
Medalists at the 2018 Asian Games
21st-century Japanese women
20th-century Japanese women